California Proposition 5, or the Nonviolent Offender Rehabilitation Act (or NORA) was an initiated state statute that appeared as a ballot measure on the November 2008 ballot in California. It was disapproved by voters on November 4 of that year.

Provisions of the initiative
Proposition 5:

 Requires California to expand and increase funding and oversight for individualized treatment and rehabilitation programs for nonviolent drug offenders and parolees.
 Reduces criminal consequences of nonviolent drug offenses by mandating three-tiered probation with treatment and by providing for case dismissal and/or sealing of records after probation.
 Limits the courts' authority to incarcerate offenders who violate probation or parole.
 Shortens parole for most drug offenses, including sales, and for nonviolent property crimes.
 Creates numerous divisions, boards, commissions, and reporting requirements regarding drug treatment and rehabilitation. 
 Changes certain marijuana misdemeanors to infractions.

Fiscal impact analysis
According to the state of California, the initiative, if it passes, would lead to:

 Increased state costs that could exceed $1 billion annually primarily for expanding drug treatment and rehabilitation programs for offenders in state prisons, on parole, and in the community.
 Savings to the state that could exceed $1 billion annually due primarily to reduced prison and parole operating costs.
 Net savings on a one-time basis on capital outlay costs for prison facilities that could exceed $2.5 billion.
 Unknown net fiscal effect on expenditures for county operations and capital outlay.

Supporters
The official proponent of the measure is Daniel Abrahamson.

Argument in favor of Prop 5
Notable arguments that have been made in favor of Prop 5 include:

 Prop 5 would reduce pressure on overcrowded and expensive prisons.
 Prop. 5 creates treatment options for young people with drug problems that do not exist under current law
 Voter-approved Proposition 36 provided treatment, not jail, for nonviolent drug users.
 One-third have completed treatment and became productive, tax-paying citizens. 
 Since 2000, Prop. 36 has graduated 84,000 people and saved almost $2 billion."

Donors to the Prop 5 campaign
As of September 6, 2008, the five largest donors to the "Yes on 5" campaign are:

 George Soros, $1,400,000;
 Jacob Goldfield, $1,400,000.
 Bob Wilson, $700,000;
 John Sperling, $500,000;
 The Drug Policy Alliance Network, $400,000.

Path to ballot
The petition drive conducted to qualify the measure for the fall ballot was conducted by Progressive Campaigns, Inc. at a cost of about $1.762 million.

Opposition

People Against the Proposition 5 Deception is the official committee against the proposition.

Other opponents include:
 Actor Martin Sheen
 Rational Recovery founder Jack Trimpey

Arguments against Prop 5
Notable arguments that have been made against Prop 5 include:

 Proposition 5 has been called the "Drug Dealers’ Bill of Rights" because it shortens parole for methamphetamine dealers and other drug felons from 3 years to 6 months.
 This measure may provide a 'get-out-of-jail-free' card to many of those accused of other crimes by claiming drugs made them do it, letting them effectively escape criminal prosecution."
 Proposition 5 establishes two new bureaucracies with virtually no accountability, and which will cost hundreds of millions in taxpayer dollars.
 This is a long law that changes many statutes that most voters will not even read in sufficient detail
 Addicted defendants will be permitted five violations of probation or treatment failures based on drug use, and judges will be unable to meaningfully intervene until the sixth violation.

Donors to no on 5 Campaign
As of October 16, 2008, the ten largest donors for 'No on 5' are:

 California Correctional Peace Officers Association, $1,000,000 
 Margaret Whitman, $250,000
 A Jerrold Perenchio, $250,000
 Sycuan Band of the Kumeyaay Nation, $175,000
 California Republican Party, $238,000
 Save Our Society From Drugs, $115,000
 Los Angeles Police Protective League, $101,800
 California Beer & Beverage Distributors, $100,000
 California Narcotics Officers Association, $60,000
 Peace Officers Research Association of California, $56,000

Lawsuit to remove from ballot
Opponents of Proposition 5, including thirty-two district attorneys and former California governors Pete Wilson and Gray Davis, petitioned the California Supreme Court to issue a preemptory writ of mandate to remove Proposition 5 from the November ballot. The lawsuit alleges that Proposition 5 attempts to alter the constitution via statute, which is unconstitutional.

The California Supreme Court declined to issue the preemptory writ. Generally, initiatives' constitutionality are not reviewed until after a vote has passed and the initiative becomes law.

Newspaper endorsements
The Huffington Post

Editorial boards opposed
 The Los Angeles Times 
The Pasadena Star News

Results

References

External links

Official campaigns
 Yes on Proposition 5
 No on Proposition 5

Further reading
 Peter Schrag: Props. 5 and 8 will make waves nationally
 California Ballot Propositions May Start National Trend on Prisons and Rehabilitation of Drug Offenders and Same Sex Marriage
 A televised debate on Prop 5 hosted by Democracy Now

Basic information
 California Voter's Guide for Proposition 5
 Official Text of the Initiative
 Signatures pending validation
 CaliforniaPropositions.org Prop 5 information page
 California Voter Online guide to Proposition 5
 Smart Voter Guide to Proposition 5
 Election Night Results - CA Secretary of State

5
Initiatives in the United States